Ramón de la Cruz (28 March 1731 – 5 March 1794) was a Spanish neoclassical dramatist.

Born in Madrid, he was a clerk in the ministry of finance. He is the author of three hundred sainetes, little farcical sketches of city life, written to be played between the acts of a longer play. He published a selection in ten volumes (Madrid, 1786–1791). The best of his pieces, such as Las Tertulias de Madrid, are specimens of satiric observation.

References

External links

1731 births
1794 deaths
Writers from Madrid
Spanish dramatists and playwrights
Spanish male dramatists and playwrights
Clerks
Spanish opera librettists
18th-century Spanish writers
18th-century dramatists and playwrights
18th-century male writers